The 2017 season is the 122nd year in the club's history, the 106th season in Clube de Regatas do Flamengo's football existence, and their 47th in the Brazilian Série A, having never been relegated from the top division.

After finishing 2016 Brazilian Série A in 3rd place Flamengo earned a spot to play CONMEBOL Libertadores Bridgestone 2017, returning to the South America top club competition since last played in 2014. The club will also play 2017 Rio de Janeiro State League, 2017 Primeira Liga and 2017 Copa do Brasil.

Kits
Supplier: Adidas / Sponsor: Caixa / Back of the shirt: MRV / Lower back: YES! Idiomas / Shoulder: Universidade Brasil / Sleeves: Carabao / Numbers: TIM / Socks: Kodilar

Club

First-team staff

As of 12 August 2017.

Other information

First-team squad

Players with Dual Nationality
   Diego
   Ederson
   Federico Mancuello
   Rhodolfo

Reserves

Transfers

In

Out

Loan in

Loan out

Statistics

Appearances and goals
Last updated on 13 December 2017.
 Players in italic have left the club during the season.

Top scorers
Includes all competitive matches

Clean sheets
Includes all competitive matches

Disciplinary record

Overview

Pre-season and friendlies
On 30 August 2016 Flamengo announced that would take part of 2017 Florida Cup, although on 12 December 2017 the club forfeit from the pre-season competition due to the reschedule of its pre-season training, instead the club would have all the preparation to the 2017 season in its recently opened training ground, Ninho do Urubu. The change was caused by the LaMia Flight 2933 accident with Chapecoense that forced change of dates in the end of 2016 Brazilian season.

On 11 January 2017 it was announced that the first pre-season match would be against Vila Nova, at Estádio Olímpico de Goiânia. On the next day it was confirmed that the match would be held at Estádio Serra Dourada.

Match(es)

Competitions

Rio State League (Campeonato Carioca)

Taça Guanabara

Matches

Semifinal (Taça Guanabara)

Final (Taça Guanabara)

Taça Rio

Matches

Semifinal (Taça Rio)

Final stage

Semifinal

Final

Average attendances
Includes all matches in the 2017 Campeonato Carioca.

Primeira Liga

On 30 December 2016 Primeira Liga announced the 2017 season schedule with Flamengo playing its first match against Grêmio.

Group stage

Matches

Quarterfinals

Average attendances
Includes all matches in the 2017 Primeira Liga.

Copa do Brasil

As Flamengo played in the 2017 CONMEBOL Libertadores, the club only entered the competition in the round of 16.

Round of 16

Quarterfinals

Semifinals

Final

Average attendances
Includes all home matches in the 2017 Copa do Brasil.

Série A

League table

Results summary

Results by round

Average attendances
Includes all home matches in the 2017 Série A.

Matches
Goals and red cards are shown.

Copa Libertadores

The draw of the tournament was held on 21 December 2016, 20:00 PYST (UTC−3), at the CONMEBOL Convention Centre in Luque, Paraguay.

According to CONMEBOL historic rankings Flamengo was set on the pot number 3 and draw to the group 4 with San Lorenzo from Argentina (pot 1), Universidad Católica from Chile (pot 2) and fellow Brazilian club Atlético Paranaense, coming from the qualifying stages.

Although assembling a strong team aiming a strong result at Copa Libertadores, Flamengo had a disappointing campaign in the group stage. The club won all three matches at home with the highest attendance average of the competition, but lost all three away matches, including the last match in Buenos Aires against San Lorenzo suffering a goal in the injury time. Flamengo finished the group stage in third and earned a spot in the Copa Sudamericana second stage.

Group stage

Matches

Average attendances
Includes all home matches in the 2017 Copa Libertadores.

Copa Sudamericana

Second stage

Round of 16

Quarterfinals

Semifinals

Final

Average attendances
Includes all home matches in the 2017 Copa Sudamericana.

Honors

Individuals

Club Ranking
Flamengo position on the Club World Ranking during the 2017 season, according to clubworldranking.com.

References

External links
 Clube de Regatas do Flamengo
 Flamengo official website (in Portuguese)

Brazilian football clubs 2017 season
CR Flamengo seasons